Fujerd and Fojird and Fowjerd may refer to:
 Fujerd, Golestan
 Fujerd, Qom